Theron S. Copeland (July 30, 1831 – July 8, 1905) was an American law enforcement officer and police captain with the New York City Police Department. He studied military tactics at a military academy and in the National Guard before joining the police force in 1855. Much of his career was spent as a drillmaster and, during the New York Draft Riots in 1863, he was part of the force under Inspector Daniel C. Carpenter who confronted a mob intending to loot the New York financial district and the United States sub-treasury. Copeland was later named in a general address to the police force for displaying "valor and intelligent service" during the riots.

In January 1903, he retired at the rank of captain after 41 years of service. He died at Barlow Street on July 8, 1905. Survived by his wife and eleven children, his funeral was held at their home and was buried at Greenwood Cemetery.

References

Further reading
Bernstein, Iver. The New York City Draft Riots: Their Significance for American Society and Politics in the Age of the Civil War. New York: Oxford University Press, 1991.
Cook, Adrian. The Armies of the Streets: The New York City Draft Riots of 1863. Lexington: University Press of Kentucky, 1974.
Costello, Augustine E. Our Police Protectors: History of the New York Police from the Earliest Period to the Present Time. New York: A.E. Costello, 1885. 
Headley, J.T. The Great Riots of New York, 1712 to 1873, Including a Full and Complete Account of the Four Days' Draft Riot of 1863. New York: E.B. Treat, 1873.
Hickey, John J. Our Police Guardians: History of the Police Department of the City of New York, and the Policing of Same for the Past One Hundred Years. New York: John J. Hickey, 1925. 
McCague, James. The Second Rebellion: The Story of the New York City Draft Riots of 1863. New York: Dial Press, 1968.

1831 births
1905 deaths
Burials at Green-Wood Cemetery
New York City Police Department officers
People from Albany, New York